Pathfork is an unincorporated community and census-designated place (CDP) in Harlan County, Kentucky, United States, located to the south bank of Wallins Creek. Its population was 379 as of the 2010 census. The community's main roads are East Hwy 72, which connects from US 119, and travels to an end at Old RB Mines, however, 72 runs to Harlan via gravel road, and Ky 2005 an old gravel road that leads to Smith/Brownies Creek, south of Harlan, Kentucky.

Demographics

Overview
The community used to rely heavily on coal mining, but the coal industry in Pathfork has faced significant challenges in recent years due to the increasing use of natural gas and renewable energy sources. A small community park, known as Coal Miner's Memorial Park, was created to honor the community's ties to coal mining.

There are four churches in the community: Insull Holiness, Pathfork Holiness Church, Pathfork Baptist, and Blackstar Pentecostal Church.

References

Census-designated places in Kentucky
Census-designated places in Harlan County, Kentucky
Unincorporated communities in Kentucky
Unincorporated communities in Harlan County, Kentucky
Coal towns in Kentucky